A stringybark can be any of the many Eucalyptus species which have thick, fibrous bark. Like all eucalypts, stringybarks belong to the family Myrtaceae. In exceptionally fertile locations some stringybark species (in particular messmate stringybark (Eucalyptus obliqua) can be very large, reaching over 80 metres in height. More typically, stringybarks are medium-sized trees in the 10 to 40 metre range.

Early European colonists often used the bark for roofing and walls of huts.

The term stringybark is a descriptive, vernacular name and does not imply any special taxonomic relationship within the genus Eucalyptus. For example, scientists consider Eucalyptus obliqua to not be closely related to the other stringybarks, because of the gumnut shape. And Eucalyptus acmenoides is part of the mahogany group of eucalyptus. Also as the gumnuts are a different shape, despite the bark being somewhat stringy.

There are many different species of stringybark, including:

 Blue-leaved stringybark (Eucalyptus agglomerata)
 Brown stringybark (Eucalyptus baxteri, Eucalyptus laevopinea)
 Mealy stringybark or silver stringybark (Eucalyptus cephalocarpa)
 Messmate stringybark (Eucalyptus obliqua)
 Privet-leaved stringybark (Eucalyptus ligustrina)
 Red stringybark (Eucalyptus macrorhyncha)
 Tindale's stringybark (Eucalyptus tindaliae)
 Yellow stringybark (Eucalyptus acmenoides, Eucalyptus muelleriana, Eucalyptus umbra)
 Thin-leaved stringybark (Eucalyptus eugenioides)
 White stringybark (Eucalyptus globoidea)
 Wollemi stringybark (Eucalyptus expressa)
 Stringybark or narrow-leaved stringybark (Eucalyptus oblonga)
 Stringybark (Eucalyptus tenella)

Studies have shown that blue-leaved stringybark is one of the 20-odd eucalypts preferred by koalas.

References 

Eucalyptus